Military Bishop is a military rank and position within the Finnish Defence Forces. The Military Bishop is the leader of both Lutheran and Orthodox priests and deacons serving in the army as military chaplains. The office was founded by President Risto Ryti in 1941. The position of military bishop is comparable to that of a brigadier general.

Though the Military Bishop is styled "bishop" and is a member of the Synod of Bishops of the Evangelical Lutheran Church of Finland, he is not a "bishop" in the doctrinal sense of the term. Military bishops are not ordained as bishops and cannot in turn ordain priests. Their jurisdiction, the Finnish Defence Forces, does not constitute a diocese, and military chaplains belong to the dioceses of their assigned stations. Similarly, the service members belong to the parishes of their domiciles.

Military Bishops of the Finnish Defence Forces
Johannes Björklund 1941-1956
Toivo Laitinen 1956-1969
Yrjö Massa 1969-1978
Viljo Remes 1978-1986
Jorma Laulaja 1986-1995
Hannu Niskanen1995-2012
Pekka Särkiö 2012-present

Insignia

References

See also
Evangelical Lutheran Church of Finland
Finnish Orthodox Church
Finnish Defence Forces

Military ranks of Finland
Religion in the military